A nonsteroidal compound is a drug that is not a steroid nor a steroid derivative. Nonsteroidal anti-inflammatory drugs (NSAIDs) are distinguished from corticosteroids as a class of anti-inflammatory agents.

List of nonsteroidal steroid receptor modulators
Examples include the following:

 Estrogens: benzestrol, bifluranol, estrobin (DBE), diethylstilbestrol (stilbestrol), dienestrol, erteberel, fosfestrol, hexestrol (dihydroxystilbestrol), methallenestril, methestrol, methestrol dipropionate, paroxypropione, prinaberel, and triphenylethylene, as well as many xenoestrogens
 : acolbifene, afimoxifene, arzoxifene, bazedoxifene, broparestrol, chlorotrianisene, clomifene, clomifenoxide, cyclofenil, droloxifene, enclomifene, endoxifen, ethamoxytriphetol, fispemifene, idoxifene, lasofoxifene, levormeloxifene, miproxifene, nafoxidine, nitromifene, ormeloxifene, ospemifene, panomifene, pipendoxifene, raloxifene, tamoxifen, toremifene, trioxifene, zindoxifene, zuclomifene
 Antiandrogens: apalutamide, bicalutamide, cimetidine, darolutamide, DIMP, enzalutamide, EPI-001, EPI-506, flutamide, hydroxyflutamide, inocoterone, inocoterone acetate, nilutamide, RU-58642, RU-58841, and topilutamide
 : AC-262,356, acetothiolutamide, andarine, BMS-564,929, enobosarm (ostarine), LGD-2226, LGD-3303, LGD-4033, S-23, and S-40503
 Aromatase inhibitors: anastrozole, aminoglutethimide, fadrozole, finrozole, letrozole, liarozole, norendoxifen, rogletimide (pyridoglutethimide), vorozole
 Other steroidogenesis inhibitors: aminoglutethimide, ketoconazole, orteronel, seviteronel, others
 Miscellaneous: tanaproget (progestogen), finerenone (antimineralocorticoid), esaxerenone (antimineralocorticoid), apararenone (antimineralocorticoid), AZD5423 (glucocorticoid), mapracorat

See also
 Nonsteroidal antiandrogen
 Nonsteroidal estrogen

References

Further reading
 
 
 

Pharmacology